Burange is a neighbourhood in the north of Dudelange, in southern Luxembourg.  It is the location of Stade J.F. Kennedy.

Burange is served by Dudelange-Burange railway station, the northernmost of Dudelange's four stations.

Quarters of Dudelange